In abstract algebra, a basic subgroup is a subgroup of an abelian group which is a direct sum of cyclic subgroups and satisfies further technical conditions. This notion was introduced by L. Ya. Kulikov (for p-groups) and by László Fuchs (in general) in an attempt to formulate classification theory of infinite abelian groups that goes beyond the Prüfer theorems. It helps to reduce the classification problem to classification of possible extensions between two well understood classes of abelian groups: direct sums of cyclic groups and divisible groups.

Definition and properties 

A subgroup, of an abelian group, is called  p-basic, for a fixed prime number, if the following conditions hold:

  is a direct sum of cyclic groups of order  and infinite cyclic groups;
 The quotient group, is a p-divisible group.

Picking a generator in each cyclic direct summand of  creates a  p-basis of B, which is analogous to a basis of a vector space or a free abelian group.

Abelian groups that contain a unique p-basic subgroup have been completely characterized. For the case of p-groups they are either divisible or bounded; i.e., have bounded exponent.

Generalization to modules 

The notion of a p-basic subgroup in an abelian p-group admits a direct generalization to modules over a principal ideal domain. The existence of such a basic submodule and uniqueness of its isomorphism type continue to hold.

References 

 László Fuchs (1970), Infinite abelian groups, Vol. I. Pure and Applied Mathematics, Vol. 36. New York–London: Academic Press 
 L. Ya. Kulikov, On the theory of abelian groups of arbitrary cardinality (in Russian), Mat. Sb., 16 (1945), 129–162

Abelian group theory
Infinite group theory
Subgroup properties